Mount Williams is an unincorporated community in Frederick County, Virginia, United States. Mount Williams is located on Wardensville Grade (VA 608) to the southwest of Mount Pleasant. It was also known as Lookout.

References

Unincorporated communities in Frederick County, Virginia
Unincorporated communities in Virginia